Life and Labour of the People in London was a multi-volume book by Charles Booth which provided a survey of the lives and occupations of the working class of late 19th century London. The first edition was published in two volumes as Life and Labour of the People, Vol. I (1889) and Labour and Life of the People, Vol II (1891). The second edition was entitled Life and Labour of the People in London, and was produced in 9 volumes 1892-97. A third edition, running to a grand total of seventeen volumes appeared 1902-3.

A noteworthy feature of the study was the production of maps describing poverty (see illustration on the right). Levels of wealth and poverty found by the research's investigators being mapped out on a street by street basis.

The notebooks used to carry out this investigation are held at the Archives Division of the British Library of Political and Economic Science (London School of Economics and Political Science).

See also

19th century London
Costermonger 
Poverty map

References

External links
Charles Booth's London website

1889 non-fiction books
1891 non-fiction books
Books by Charles Booth (social reformer)
19th century in London
Economic history of London